Anthony James Allmendinger (born December 16, 1981) is an American professional stock car racing driver. He competes full-time in the NASCAR Cup Series, driving the No. 16 Chevrolet Camaro ZL1 for Kaulig Racing and part-time in the NASCAR Xfinity Series, driving the No. 10 Chevrolet Camaro for Kaulig Racing.

Allmendinger's professional racing career began on the American open-wheel circuit. He earned five wins and third place overall in the 2006 Champ Car season.

Allmendinger then began competing in NASCAR for Team Red Bull. He later drove for Richard Petty Motorsports, Penske Racing, Phoenix Racing, and JTG Daugherty Racing in the Cup Series. When he lost his full-time Cup Series ride with JTGD in 2019 to Ryan Preece, he became a part-time driver for Kaulig in the Xfinity Series and part-time television broadcaster for NBC, working as a color commentator for IMSA races and an analyst on NASCAR America until 2021 when he returned to driving full-time.

Moreover, he has competed in the 24 Hours of Daytona for Michael Shank's team in 15 of the last 17 years, winning the event in 2012.

He is nicknamed "The Dinger".

Early career
Allmendinger started his racing career at the age of five, racing BMX bikes. He advanced to quarter-midgets on ovals on the West Coast by the time he was eight, and within a few years, he began racing karts, winning two International Kart Federation Grand National championships.

Allmendinger participated in the Formula Dodge National Championship in 2001, which earned him a spot in the Barber Dodge Pro Series championship in 2002, a championship he won. He also raced in New Zealand in 2002 in the New Zealand Formula Ford Championship. In 2003, he was signed to Carl Russo's RuSPORT team and won the Champ Car Atlantic Championship, winning nine pole positions and seven races.

American open-wheel racing

2004–06: RuSPORT

On February 29, 2004, Allmendinger and RuSPORT entered the Champ Car World Series, with Michel Jourdain Jr. joining Allmendinger. Red Bull also signed Allmendinger as a member of their family of athletes. He scored a run of six top-six finishes towards the end of the season and won the Roshfrans Rookie-of-the-Year Award ahead of Justin Wilson. Wilson joined the team for 2005, with both drivers having been in regular contention for podium finishes.

2006: Multiple wins with Forsythe
On June 9, 2006, RuSPORT announced that Allmendinger would be replaced by 2002 CART champion Cristiano da Matta. Team owner Russo stated: "A.J. has been with us since we created RuSPORT late in 2002...However, as RuSPORT and A.J. have progressed, we believe a different environment will help A.J. to grow even faster, and so we have made this very difficult decision." Russo also believed a former champion in da Matta would present a greater opponent for defending champion Sébastien Bourdais, who had swept the season's first four races. Five days later, Forsythe Championship Racing announced Allmendinger as their new driver, replacing Mario Domínguez. In his first race with Forsythe, Allmendinger won the Grand Prix of Portland. Allmendinger became the first American to win a Champ Car World Series event since Ryan Hunter-Reay won at the Milwaukee Mile in 2004. He then won the next two races at the Grand Prix of Cleveland and the Grand Prix of Toronto, giving him three consecutive victories in the first three races since his departure from RuSPORT. This victory moved Allmendinger into second place in the CCWS championship standings behind Bourdais.

He earned his fourth and fifth wins of the season at Denver and Road America. He left Champ Car with one race left in the season to accept a lucrative offer from NASCAR's Red Bull Racing Team. In 2007, Allmendinger commented that a lack of marketing and sponsorship due to the CART-IRL split played a role in him and several other open-wheel drivers moving to NASCAR, adding "it needs to be one series. To have all the best open-wheel drivers on this continent racing against each other, you'd hopefully get some sponsors back and get a decent TV package."

2013: Return to IndyCar with Team Penske
It was reported in late 2012 that Allmendinger could move to the now-unified IndyCar Series with Michael Shank Racing, which he co-owned, for the 2013 season. This failed to materialize; instead, he participated in IndyCar's winter testing at Sebring with Team Penske, and in March it was announced that Allmendinger would compete in the IndyCar series for the team in at least two races, at Barber Motorsports Park and at the 2013 Indianapolis 500, with the goal of adding more races later in the season. This was extended to include the Long Beach Grand Prix, the Chevy Indy Dual in Detroit, and the season finale at Fontana.

NASCAR

2006: Stock car debut

Allmendinger made his NASCAR debut in the Craftsman Truck Series driving for Bill Davis Racing at New Hampshire International Speedway on September 16, 2006, in the No. 24 Toyota Tundra. He crashed his primary truck in qualifying but started the race 32nd in a backup truck from teammate Bill Lester and finished on the lead lap in 13th. He also competed at the Talladega Superspeedway in October with a finish of fifth. In his third career truck series start, he qualified in second place at Atlanta and led five laps before he wrecked and finished 34th.

Red Bull officially announced Allmendinger as part of its 2007 Nextel Cup Series driver lineup on October 25, 2006. He attempted his first Cup Series event at Atlanta in October 2006 driving the No. 84 Red Bull-sponsored Dodge Charger; however, due to qualifying being rained out, a lack of owner's points prevented Allmendinger from making the race. He also attempted to make the race at Texas Motor Speedway, failing to qualify again.

2007–2008: Red Bull
Allmendinger and Brian Vickers were named Red Bull's drivers for 2007, with Allmendinger piloting the team's No. 84 Toyota Camry with Vickers in the team's No. 83. Allmendinger failed to qualify for the 2007 Daytona 500 after a crash in the first Gatorade Duel race. He also failed to qualify for the next three races before making his first Cup start at the fifth race of the season, the Food City 500 at Bristol. As the season progressed, Allmendinger made a handful of races, predominantly in the "Car of Tomorrow". Allmendinger failed to qualify in 19 races that season. To assist him in the transition to stock cars, he participated in selected Craftsman Truck Series races in a Toyota for the Darrell Waltrip Motorsports organization, and in the No. 42 Memorex/Chip Ganassi Dodge in the Busch Series.

Allmendinger again failed to qualify for the 2008 Daytona 500. After three failures to qualify in two attempts (qualifying for the second race of the season, Fontana, was rained out and set by 2007 owner's points), he was temporarily replaced by veteran driver Mike Skinner. Allmendinger returned to the Cup Series at Talladega. On May 17, he won the Sprint Showdown at Lowe's Motor Speedway during NASCAR's annual All-Star weekend. The win qualified Allmendinger for the Sprint All-Star Race later that evening, where he finished 17th. Due to Allmendinger's 11th-place finish at Watkins Glen, for the first time in his career, he had a guaranteed starting spot for the next race. He had his best career finish at the time at Kansas Speedway coming in ninth, but was released from the team two days later. He was replaced for the rest of the season by Scott Speed and Skinner. Allmendinger raced with for Michael Waltrip Racing for 1 race in the No. 00 and Evernham Motorsports for the last five races in the No. 10. Allmendinger posted 2 top 10's and improved in making races by only failing to qualify for just the first 3 races.

2008–2011: Richard Petty Motorsports
After signing a one-race contract with Michael Waltrip Racing, Allmendinger replaced fellow former open-wheel star Patrick Carpentier at Gillett Evernham Motorsports, scoring an average finish of 15.4th over five races in the team's No. 10 Valvoline-sponsored Dodge. During the offseason, as part of the merger between GEM and Petty Enterprises, Allmendinger was to move to the No. 19 Best Buy-sponsored Dodge replacing Elliott Sadler. However, Sadler was still under contract for the 2010 season and announced he would file suit against Allmendinger and the organization. In early January 2009, Richard Petty Motorsports announced a settlement where Sadler would remain in the No. 19 and Allmendinger would return to his 2008 team, which was renumbered 44. However, Valvoline did not commit to sponsoring the team full-time and they were forced to race without full-time sponsorship.

Allmendinger's team ended the 2008 season 36th in owner's points, meaning it did not have exemptions for the first five races of 2009. The retro-styled Valvoline 44 raced its way into the Daytona 500, and third in his Daytona 500 debut, also his personal best, and is the fourth-best Daytona 500 debut behind Lee Petty in the 1959 Daytona 500, Scott Wimmer in the 2004 Daytona 500 and Trevor Bayne in the 2011 Daytona 500. Allmendinger was one of two go-or-go-home drivers (the other being Tony Stewart, but Stewart had the past champion's provisional available) to successfully attempt the first five races of the 2009 season.

At 1:27 am on October 29, 2009, Allmendinger was arrested for drunk driving by Mooresville, North Carolina police.  He registered a .08 blood alcohol level according to a police report.  NASCAR placed him on probation for the rest of the 2009 season.
Allmendinger drove a Ford Fusion in the final three races of the season as part of RPM's transition from Dodge to Ford.

During the offseason, Allmendinger replaced Reed Sorenson in the team's famous No. 43 car. He collected two top-fives, eight top-10s, and a pole position in 2010, and finished 19th in the final standings.

After finishing 11th in the 2011 Daytona 500, Allmendinger started the season 10th in points driving the No. 43 Ford sponsored by Best Buy. Allmendinger continued to have a career-best year in 2011 with 10 top-10 finishes and an average finish of 16th. He finished the 2011 regular season contending for a wild card spot in the Chase for the Sprint Cup but came up just short. Three races before setting the field for the Chase, RPM put former Roush Fenway Racing crew chief Greg Erwin on the pit box starting at the 2011 Brickyard 400. Allmendinger and Erwin recorded six top-10 finishes after their pairing. Allmendinger finished the 2011 season a career-best 15th in the points. Allmendinger also announced that he would have a partnership stake in Mike Shank's IndyCar team MSR Indy.

2012: Team Penske, suspension

At the end of the 2011 season, Allmendinger left Richard Petty Motorsports when the driving spot for Penske Racing's No. 22 Shell/Pennzoil-sponsored Dodge became open after the parting ways of Kurt Busch and Penske. Before his suspension, his best finish was a second at Martinsville Speedway.

After failing a random drug test on July 7, 2012, Allmendinger was suspended from participation in the Coke Zero 400. Steve O'Donnell, NASCAR's senior vice president for racing operations, said that Allmendinger had up to 72 hours to request a B test sample. The next day, Penske said before the Honda Indy Toronto race that Allmendinger's B sample would be tested on Monday or Tuesday. Allmendinger requested a B sample test on July 9. On July 11, 2012, Allmendinger's camp said a stimulant caused the positive drug test. The B sample test had not yet been scheduled at that time.

On July 24, it was announced by NASCAR that Allmendinger was suspended indefinitely after the B sample tested positive for a banned stimulant, which was revealed to be amphetamine. He chose to participate in the Road to Recovery program. On August 1, he was released from his contract by Penske Racing. Allmendinger was replaced in the No. 22 by Sam Hornish Jr.; he later stated that the cause of the positive test was Adderall that he had unknowingly taken, being told it was an "energy pill". Allmendinger was reinstated by NASCAR on September 18 after completing the Road to Recovery program.

In October 2012, Allmendinger returned to NASCAR at Charlotte Motor Speedway, driving for Phoenix Racing, substituting for Phoenix's intended driver Regan Smith, who had been hired by Hendrick Motorsports to drive the No. 88 for Charlotte and Kansas while Dale Earnhardt Jr. was sidelined with a concussion.

2013: Nationwide success, part-time in Cup

On June 1, 2013, Roger Penske announced that Allmendinger would drive for his team at Road America and the Mid-Ohio Sports Car Course. In his first race of the season, the Johnsonville Sausage 200 on June 22, he won after winning the pole position and leading 29 laps, which was the most of any driver. At Mid-Ohio in August, Allmendinger dominated the race, saving fuel through a green-white-checkered finish to win and sweep the year's Nationwide Series road-course races for Penske Racing.

Sprint Cup Series
Allmendinger drove part-time for Phoenix Racing in the No. 51 Chevrolet in the Sprint Cup Series. He had several strong finishes in the first part of the season: 11th at Phoenix, 13th at Bristol, 16th at Fontana, and 14th at Richmond. His first finish worse than 20th was at Pocono, where he finished 33rd. Afterward, Allmendinger moved to the No. 47 Toyota at JTG Daugherty Racing in place of Bobby Labonte for two races, with a 19th-place finish at Michigan and 22nd-place finish at Kentucky. At Daytona, Allmendinger returned to the No. 51 and was running near the top-ten for almost the entire night until lap 148, when he was part of a wreck in the tri-oval with Denny Hamlin, Jeff Gordon, Matt Kenseth, and David Reutimann, reducing Allmendinger to a 35th-place finish.

Returning to the No. 47 at Watkins Glen, Allmendinger had another breakout run, qualifying fourth, and running in the top fifteen for most of the day, finishing in 10th place.

On August 29, 2013, the Sporting News reported that Allmendinger would be the full-time driver for JTG Daugherty Racing in 2014. This was confirmed a month later with Allmendinger signing a multi-year deal with the team.

2014: Breakthrough Cup victory
Allmendinger had a few poor opening races, but did well at Fontana, recovering from a late speeding penalty to finish eighth, as well as having top-tens at Richmond and Talladega.

At Sonoma, Allmendinger qualified on the front row with Jamie McMurray. Allmendinger led the most laps and was in position to possibly earn his first Sprint Cup victory when he was wrecked by Dale Earnhardt Jr. with 25 laps to go. Allmendinger was visibly upset with Earnhardt Jr. in post-race ceremonies.

At Watkins Glen, Allmendinger took the lead with less than 30 laps to go after a side-by-side battle with former teammate Marcos Ambrose and kept the lead until the checkered flag, earning his first Sprint Cup Series win after 213 Sprint Cup starts, leading 30 laps in the process. "My gosh, I can't believe we won a NASCAR Sprint Cup race. This whole 47 team... all the sponsors, my first Cup victory. I love these guys. I just wanted it so bad for them. For this team. They worked so hard. I wasn't going to let Marcos take that from me. I hope the fans loved that race and at home. Because it was fun in the race car." Ambrose commented on Allmendinger's win: "First of all, congratulations to A. J. and the 47 team. They deserved that win. I left nothing on the table. I tried to rattle his cage and couldn't shake him. We raced fair and square to the end there. It was a tough couple laps but it was fair. We were both giving it to each other pretty hard. No harm, no foul. We just came up a little short." Before the race, Allmendinger had announced that Kimberly-Clark Corporation (consisting of Scott, Viva, Kleenex, Cottonelle, and Huggies brands) extended its sponsorship agreement with the team through 2017.

2015

Though NASCAR expanded the grid of the Sprint Unlimited to include all the Chase drivers, Allmendinger declined the invitation, saying he wanted to save his equipment for the points races such as the Daytona 500. Instead, he joined the Motor Racing Network's radio broadcast of the race, working in the booth alongside Joe Moore and Jeff Striegle.

Allmendinger got his season off to a good start, leading a few laps during the Daytona 500. The next week at Atlanta, he finished seventh and sixth one week later at Las Vegas. On May 9, 2015, Allmendinger announced plans to sign a five-year contract extension with JTG Daugherty, allowing him to remain with the team through the 2020 season.

2016
Allmendinger nearly pulled off an upset at the 2016 STP 500 at Martinsville. He charged hard from 13th place with less than 20 laps to go, to finish second to Kyle Busch by 1.547 seconds. It tied 2012 as his career-best finish at Martinsville. Allmendinger ended the season on a high note, earning four top tens on the final 6 races and finishing 19th in the standings.

On June 8, 2016, Richard Childress Racing announced plans to add Allmendinger to their Xfinity Series driver lineup, hiring him to drive the No. 2 Chevrolet Camaro at Mid-Ohio; however, Allmendinger had a schedule conflict and Sam Hornish Jr. drove the race instead.

2017

Allmendinger started the 2017 season at Daytona by finishing in third place, equalling his best career finish in the event. At Talladega, Allmendinger was caught in a multi-car accident while running third with 19 laps to go. Allmendinger got loose drafting Chase Elliott, causing Allmendinger's car to spin out and eventually flip over. At Watkins Glen, Allmendinger ran well enough to be the highest-finishing Chevrolet in the race, placing ninth.

2018
Allmendinger opened the 2018 season with a top-ten finish in the Daytona 500 and later had an eighth-place finish at the STP 500. In May, Allmendinger won the Monster Energy Open, the second time he had taken victory in the race.

On September 25, 2018, it was announced that Allmendinger, despite having two years left on his contract from 2015, would part ways with JTG at the end of the 2018 season, ending a long-time relationship with the team.

2019–2020: Part-time with Kaulig Racing

On March 21, 2019, Kaulig Racing announced Allmendinger would join the team's No. 10 car for a part-time Xfinity Series schedule. His schedule was originally a four-race slate beginning in July at Daytona, followed by the road course events at Mid-Ohio, Road America, and the Charlotte Motor Speedway Roval. In the 2019 Circle K Firecracker 250 at Daytona, Allmendinger finished third, but was disqualified and relegated to last place after his car failed an engine vacuum test during post-race inspection.

On July 17, Kaulig announced that Allmendinger would add a fifth race to his schedule: the 2019 Zippo 200 at The Glen at Watkins Glen International on August 3, 2019. He was once again disqualified when his second-place finishing car was discovered to be too low on both rear corners during post-race inspection.

At his final start of the year at the Charlotte Roval, he picked up his first win of the season and third of his Xfinity Series career, beating out RCR driver Tyler Reddick.

A few weeks after his Roval win, Kaulig president Chris Rice stated in an interview that Allmendinger would tentatively return to the team to drive for them in all of the Xfinity Series road course races again. In addition to those four races, he added he could likely run the new race for the series at Martinsville, a track that Allmendinger has historically performed well at throughout his NASCAR career. Allmendinger formally moved to the No. 16, Kaulig's part-time third car, for 2020 because the No. 10 was taken over full-time by Ross Chastain. On January 30, 2020, Kaulig Racing announced Allmendinger would appear in eight races for the team, predominantly at the road courses and superspeedways. Further races at Bristol and Atlanta were later added to his schedule, the latter in which he scored his first career victory on an oval.

The Atlanta victory made Allmendinger eligible for the series' $100,000 Dash 4 Cash bonus available the following week at Homestead-Miami. Kaulig added the race to Allmendinger's schedule, where he finished fourth, enough to claim the bonus.

At the Cup Series race at Martinsville in June, Allmendinger was on standby for RCR's Austin Dillon, who was expecting his first child with his wife, Whitney. Allmendinger continued acting on standby until Homestead-Miami but was not needed as Dillon's son was born Sunday morning before the Homestead race.

In August, Allmendinger finished second at Road America to Team Penske's Austin Cindric. At the Daytona road course race, Allmendinger finished fourth but was involved in controversy as he spun Justin Allgaier in the closing laps, leading to a confrontation between the two drivers. Allmendinger was leading going into the final corner of the August Daytona oval race but wrecked after contact with his Kaulig teammate Ross Chastain.

In October, Allmendinger defended his win on the Charlotte Roval, taking victory at the track for the second year in a row in a race affected by rain and darkness.

2021–22: Full-time at Kaulig and return to the NASCAR Cup Series

On December 1, 2020, Kaulig announced that Allmendinger would run the full 2021 Xfinity Series schedule for the team. He also joined the team's Cup Series program for the Daytona road course, marking his first Cup series race since 2018. In March, Allmendinger earned his sixth career win by passing Daniel Hemric on a late-race restart at Las Vegas. He scored a second win at Mid-Ohio in June.

On August 5, 2021, GMS Racing announced that Allmendinger would run his first Camping World Truck Series race since 2008 at the regular-season finale at Watkins Glen International, replacing its normal driver Chase Purdy after he tested positive for COVID-19.

On August 15, 2021, Allmendinger scored his second career Cup series win at the Indianapolis road course, giving Kaulig Racing its first victory in the Cup series.

At Bristol, battling with Austin Cindric for the regular-season championship, Allmendinger won the race as well as the regular-season title, despite crashing at the finish similar to Terry Labonte at the 1995 Goody's 500 at Bristol when Labonte was spun by Dale Earnhardt and still won.

After his win at the 2021 Drive for the Cure 250, Allmendinger broke the record for most wins (6) at a road course in NASCAR Xfinity series history. This record was previously held by Austin Cindric.

In November 2021, it was announced that Allmendinger would be scheduled to run 14 races for Kaulig Racing during the 2022 NASCAR Cup series season. However, due to Alex Bowman's concussion-like symptoms and Noah Gragson replacing him, Allmendinger would make the last four races instead of Gragson.

Allmendinger started the 2022 season with a second-place finish at Daytona. He racked up wins at Circuit of the Americas, Portland, and Indianapolis. Following the 2022 Food City 300 at Bristol, Allmendinger clinched the regular season championship. He would win back-to-back races at Talladega and the Charlotte Roval. Allmendinger was unable to advance to the Championship 4, ultimately finishing 5th in the point standings.

2023: Redemption in Cup
On October 5, 2022, Kaulig Racing announced that Allmendinger would drive the No. 16 full-time in 2023, marking his first full-time Cup season since 2018.

Sports car racing

Except for 2017, Allmendinger has competed in the 24 Hours of Daytona every year since 2006.

On January 28 and 29, 2012, Allmendinger entered the Rolex 24 driving for Michael Shank Racing and drove the final segment of the 24-hour race to the victory for the team in the Daytona Prototype Division. His teammates were Justin Wilson, John Pew, and Oswaldo Negri. To do so, he had to fend off sports car racing veteran Allan McNish among others.

On January 4, 2014, it was announced that Allmendinger would return to Michael Shank Racing for the 24 Hours of Daytona. Co-driving with John Pew, Oswaldo Negri Jr. and Justin Wilson, the team finished 47th overall, 12th in the Prototype class.

Television career
Allmendinger first ventured into television with Fox Sports' NASCAR Race Hub, serving as a recurring driver analyst while still racing full-time for JTG Daugherty Racing. On December 19, 2018, NBC Sports announced plans to hire Allmendinger as an analyst for their IMSA Sports Car coverage. He would also be a contributor to NBCSN's NASCAR America.

Additionally, Allmendinger joined NBCSN's coverage of American Flat Track as an analyst for the 2019 season. In July 2019, Allmendinger joined the IndyCar Series on NBC booth for the Iowa Speedway event, working alongside Leigh Diffey and Paul Tracy.

Personal life
Allmendinger was born in Santa Clara but raised in Los Gatos, both suburbs of the San Francisco Bay area.

Allmendinger was married to Canadian model and 2003 Miss Molson Indy Canada Lynne Kushnirenko in January 2007 after meeting her at a Champ Car race in Toronto in 2005. The two filed for divorce in 2012.

In 2019, Allmendinger married longtime girlfriend Tara Meador. The two own a pet cat named Mr. Tickles.

Allmendinger was very close friends with his former RuSPORT and Rolex 24 teammate Justin Wilson. After Wilson's death in 2015, former RuSPORT president Jeremy Dale recalled their positive relationship as teammates as something that helped Allmendinger's growth as a driver. Allmendinger honored Wilson throughout the final races of the 2015 Cup Series season by placing Wilson's name above the window of his car. He also stated after Wilson's death that he would only return to IndyCar racing if the series implemented cockpit protection.

Motorsports career results

American open-wheel racing
(key)

Barber Dodge Pro Series

Atlantic Championship

Champ Car World Series

IndyCar Series

Indianapolis 500

NASCAR
(key) (Bold – Pole position awarded by qualifying time. Italics – Pole position earned by points standings or practice time. * – Most laps led.)

Cup Series

Daytona 500

Xfinity Series

Camping World Truck Series

 Season still in progress
 Ineligible for series championship points

Complete sports car racing results

Rolex Sports Car Series results
(key) (Races in bold indicate pole position) (Races in italics indicate fastest lap)

IMSA WeatherTech Sportscar Championship

24 Hours of Daytona

References

External links

 
 Official profile at Kaulig Racing
 
 A.J. Allmendinger at Driver Database

Living people
1981 births
Sportspeople from Santa Clara County, California
Racing drivers from California
Racing drivers from San Jose, California
24 Hours of Daytona drivers
NASCAR drivers
Champ Car drivers
Indianapolis 500 drivers
IndyCar Series drivers
IndyCar Series team owners
Atlantic Championship drivers
Rolex Sports Car Series drivers
International Kart Federation drivers
Doping cases in auto racing
American sportspeople in doping cases
Sportspeople from the San Francisco Bay Area
Barber Pro Series drivers
WeatherTech SportsCar Championship drivers
Chip Ganassi Racing drivers
Team Penske drivers
NASCAR Xfinity Series regular season champions
World Karting Association drivers
Meyer Shank Racing drivers
Forsythe Racing drivers
RuSPORT drivers
Evernham Motorsports drivers
Michael Waltrip Racing drivers